The 2012–13 Atlas season was the 66th professional season of Mexico's top-flight football league. The season is split into two tournaments—the Torneo Apertura and the Torneo Clausura—each with identical formats and each contested by the same eighteen teams. Atlas began their season on July 22, 2012 against UNAM, Atlas played their homes games on Saturdays at 9:00pm local time. Atlas did not qualify to the final phase in the Apertura tournament and was eliminated in the quarter-finals by Santos Laguna in the Clausura tournament.

Tornero Apertura

Squad

Regular season

Apertura 2012 results

Goalscorers

Results

Results summary

Results by round

Apertura 2012 Copa MX

Group stage

Apertura results

Goalscorers

Results

Results by round

Tornero Clausura

Squad

Regular season

Clausura 2013 results

Final phase

Santos Laguna advanced 3–1 on aggregate

Goalscorers

Regular season

Source:

Final phase

Results

Results summary

Results by round

Clausura 2013 Copa MX

Group stage

Clausura results

Knockout stage

Goalscorers

Results

Results by round

References

Mexican football clubs 2012–13 season
Club Atlas seasons